Kamilla Asylova (born 14 September 1998) is a Kazakhstani model who was crowned Miss Universe Kazakhstan 2016 and represented Kazakhstan at Miss Universe 2017.

Early and personal life
Kamilla was born and raised in Almaty, Kazakhstan.

Pageantry

Miss Almaty 2016
On October 9, 2016, Kamila won the title of Miss Almaty 2016, defeating 21 other contestants.

Miss Universe 2017
She competed at Miss Universe 2017 but Unplaced.

References

External links

Miss Universe 2017 contestants
1998 births
Living people
Miss Kazakhstan winners
Kazakhstani beauty pageant winners